"Hey, Slavs" is a patriotic song dedicated to the Slavs and widely considered to be the Pan-Slavic anthem. It was adapted and adopted as the national anthem of various Slavic-speaking nations, movements and organizations during the late 19th and 20th century.

Its lyrics were first written in 1834 under the title "Hey, Slovaks" ("Hej, Slováci") by Samo Tomášik and it has since served as the anthem of the Pan-Slavic movement, the organizational anthem of the Sokol movement, and the national anthems of the First Slovak Republic, Yugoslavia and Serbia and Montenegro. The song is also considered to be the unofficial second ethnic anthem of the Slovaks. Its melody is based on "Mazurek Dąbrowskiego", which has also been the national anthem of Poland since 1926, but the Yugoslav variation has a slower tempo, is more accentuated, and does not repeat the last four lines as it repeats the last two lines.

Etymology
In Serbo-Croatian, which uses both the Latin and the Cyrillic alphabets, the song had been titled as (in Croatian and in Serbian standard, respectively):

In Macedonian the song's title is "Ej, Sloveni", and in Slovene, it is "Hej, Slovani". The original title in Slovak was "Hej, Slováci".

Slovakia

The song was written initially in Czech by the Slovak Lutheran minister Samuel Tomášik while he was visiting Prague in 1834. He was appalled that German was more commonly heard in the streets of Prague than Czech. He wrote in his diary: 	

"If mother Prague, the pearl of the Western Slavic world, is to be lost in a German sea, what awaits my dear homeland, Slovakia, which looks to Prague for spiritual nourishment? Burdened by that thought, I remembered the old Polish song Jeszcze Polska nie zginęła, kiedy my żyjemy ("Poland has not yet perished as long as we live."). That familiar melody caused my heart to erupt with a defiant Hej, Slováci, ešte naša slovenská reč žije ("Hey, Slovaks, our Slovak language still lives")... I ran to my room, lit a candle and wrote down three verses into my diary in pencil. The song was finished in a moment." (Diary of Samuel Tomášik, Sunday, 2 November 1834)

Originally Tomášik left the instructions for his song to be sung to the melody of Dąbrowski's Mazurka: "It be sung as: Poland has not yet perished".

He soon altered the lyrics to include all Slavs and "Hey, Slavs" became a widely known rallying song for Slav nationalism and Pan-Slavic sentiment, especially in the West Slavic lands governed by Austria. It was printed in numerous magazines and calendars and sung at political gatherings, becoming an unofficial anthem of the Pan-Slavic movement.

Its popularity continued to increase when it was adopted as the organizational anthem of the Sokol ("falcon") physical education movement, which was based on Pan-Slavic ideals and active across Austria-Hungary. In 1905, the erection of a monument to the Slovene poet France Prešeren in Ljubljana was celebrated by a large gathering of people singing "Hey, Slavs". During the First World War, the song was often used by Slavic soldiers from opposite sides of the front line to communicate common nationalist sentiment and prevent bloodshed.

In Slovakia, the song "Hey, Slovaks" has been considered the unofficial ethnic anthem of the Slovaks throughout its modern history, especially at times of revolution. Although after the First World War the song "Nad Tatrou sa blýska" became the official Slovak part in the national anthem of Czechoslovakia and then again in 1993 in anthem of independent Slovakia, "Hey, Slovaks" is still considered a "second" national anthem by many (usually more nationalistic) people. Contrary to popular assumption, there was no official state anthem of the clerofascist Slovak Republic (1939–45), though "Hej, Slováci" was used by the ruling party.

Yugoslavia

The first appearance of "Hey, Slavs" in Yugoslavia was during the Illyrian movement. Dragutin Rakovac translated the song, naming it "Hey, Illyrians". Until the Second World War, the translation did not undergo many changes, except that the Illyrians became Slavs.

In 1941 the Second World War engulfed the Kingdom of Yugoslavia. The Axis powers invaded in early April, and the Yugoslav royal army disintegrated and capitulated in just two and a half weeks. Since the old Yugoslav anthem included references to king and kingdom, the anti-royalist Partisan resistance led by Josip Broz Tito and his Communist party decided to avoid it and opted for "Hey, Slavs" instead. The song was sung at both the first and second sessions of AVNOJ, the legislative body of the resistance, and it gradually became the de facto national anthem of Democratic Federal Yugoslavia (new Yugoslavia).

The old state anthem was officially abandoned after liberation in 1945, but no new national anthem to replace it was officially adopted. There were several attempts to promote other, more specifically Yugoslav songs as the national anthem, but none gained much public support and "Hey, Slavs" continued to be used unofficially. The search for a better candidate continued up to 1988, while in 1977 the law only named the national anthem as "Hey, Slavs" as a temporary state anthem until a new one was adopted, which never happened.

"Hey, Slavs under its Serbo-Croatian title "" was therefore the national anthem of Yugoslavia for a total of 48 years, from 1943 to 1992. With the formal adoption (inauguration) of Amendment IX to the Constitution of the Socialist Federal Republic of Yugoslavia, the song "Hey, Slavs" gained constitutional sanction as the national anthem on November 25, 1988. After 43 years of continued use as the de facto national anthem, the delegates simply brought the law in line with custom.

Serbia and Montenegro
After the break-up of Yugoslavia in 1991 and 1992, when only Serbia and Montenegro remained in the federation, "Hey, Slavs" continued to be used, as the national anthem of the Federal Republic of Yugoslavia (FRY). Slobodan Milošević wanted to adopt “Hey, Slavs” as the Serbian anthem, but the Main Board of the Socialist Party of Serbia overruled it, feeling that it was inappropriate to reuse it after having assigned it to Yugoslavia, thus they assigned Serbia “March on the Drina” instead. The FRY was renamed to the State Union of Serbia and Montenegro in 2003 and was expected to adopt a new national anthem, but since no agreement over state symbols could be reached, "Hey, Slavs" remained the national anthem of the state. Many Serbs disliked the song during this period and booed it whenever it was played, such as at sporting events and soccer games.

A hybrid of the Montenegrin folk song (now national anthem) "Oj, svijetla majska zoro" with the former (now current) Serbian national anthem, "Bože Pravde" in alternating verses was proposed (similarly to Czechoslovakia, whose anthem consisted of the Czech part "Kde domov můj" and the Slovak part "Nad Tatrou sa blýska"). However, this attempt was struck down after objections by the People's Party of Montenegro and the Socialist People's Party of Montenegro. Also proposed was the former Montenegrin national anthem and patriotic song "Onamo, 'namo", however this also fell through and "Hey, Slavs" remained the national anthem. Since Montenegro and Serbia dissolved their union and split to become sovereign states in 2006, this issue is moot, as "Hey, Slavs" is no longer used as an official national anthem by any sovereign state. In a way, "Hey, Slavs" ended up outliving the countries that used it, as the last instance of it being officially played as part of an event was at the 2006 FIFA World Cup, where the Serbia and Montenegro national football team participated despite the country they were playing for no longer existing (having disbanded a few days before the tournament began).

Even after the end of the federation, "Hey, Slavs" was sometimes still mistakenly played by organizers of sports events that involve Serbian teams as a guest side. Notable performances, some of which were intentional, include the 2013 UEFA U-19 Championship semi-final football match between Serbia and Portugal as well as the Olympiacos–Partizan ULEB Champions league basketball game in 2010. In 2015, French organizers of 2015 European Touring Car Cup season erroneously played "Hey, Slavs" when Serbian racing driver Dušan Borković won 1st place at Circuit Paul Ricard.

Other countries
The anthem is also used as a patriotic song across the Slavic world and has been sung in many different Slavic languages.

Title in Slavic languages

In popular culture
The Yugoslav band Bijelo Dugme recorded a version of the song for their 1984 self-titled album. The Yugoslav and Slovenian band Laibach recorded an electronic version of the song, with lyrics in both English and Slovene, for their 2006 album Volk. The song is also featured in the 2002 Slovenian film Headnoise.

References

External links

 Socialist Federal Republic of Yugoslavia anthem with audio, information and lyrics (archived 2 May 2012)
 

Historical national anthems
National symbols of Yugoslavia
Yugoslav Partisan songs
Socialist Federal Republic of Yugoslavia
Slavic culture
Sokol
1834 poems
European anthems
Pan-Slavism
National anthem compositions in F major